The economy of Brazil is historically the largest in Latin America and the Southern Hemisphere in nominal terms. The Brazilian economy is the third largest in the Americas. The economy is a middle income developing mixed economy. In 2022, according to International Monetary Fund (IMF), Brazil has the 12th largest gross domestic product (GDP) in the world and has the 8th largest purchasing power parity in the world.

In 2022, according to International Monetary Fund (IMF), Brazilian nominal GDP was US$1.894 trillion, the country has a long history of being among the ten largest economies in the world. The GDP per capita was US$8,857 per inhabitant.

The country is rich in natural resources. From 2000 to 2012, Brazil was one of the fastest-growing major economies in the world, with an average annual GDP growth rate of over 5%. Its GDP surpassed that of the United Kingdom in 2012, temporarily making Brazil the world's sixth-largest economy. However, Brazil's economic growth decelerated in 2013 and the country entered a recession in 2014. The economy started to recover in 2017, with a 1% growth in the first quarter, followed by a 0.3% growth in second quarter compared to the same period of the previous year. It officially exited the recession.

According to the World Economic Forum, Brazil was the top country in upward evolution of competitiveness in 2009, gaining eight positions among other countries, overcoming Russia for the first time, and partially closing the competitiveness gap with India and China among the BRICS economies. Important steps taken since the 1990s toward fiscal sustainability, as well as measures taken to liberalize and open the economy, have significantly boosted the country's competitiveness fundamentals, providing a better environment for private-sector development.

In 2020, Forbes ranked Brazil as having the 7th largest number of billionaires in the world. Brazil is a member of diverse economic organizations, such as Mercosur, Prosur, G8+5, G20, WTO, Paris Club, Cairns Group, and is advanced to be a permanent member of the OECD.

From a colony focused on primary sector goods (sugar, gold and cotton), Brazil managed to create a diversified industrial base during the 20th century. The steel industry is a prime example of that, with Brazil being the 9th largest steel producer in 2018, and the 5th largest steel net exporter in 2018. Gerdau is the largest producer of long steel in the Americas, owning 337 industrial and commercial units and more than 45,000 employees across 14 countries. Petrobras, the Brazilian oil and gas company, is the most valuable company in Latin America.

History 

When the Portuguese explorers arrived in the 16th century, the native tribes of current-day Brazil totaled about 2.5 million people and had lived virtually unchanged since the Stone Age. From Portugal's colonization of Brazil (1500–1822) until the late 1930s, the Brazilian economy relied on the production of primary products for exports.

In the Portuguese Empire, Brazil was a colony subjected to an imperial mercantile policy, which had three main large-scale economic production cycles – sugar, gold and from the early 19th century on, coffee. The economy of Brazil was heavily dependent on African slave labor until the late 19th century (about 3 million imported African slaves in total). In that period Brazil was also the colony with the largest number of European settlers, most of them Portuguese (including Azoreans and Madeirans) but also some Dutch (see Dutch Brazil), Spaniards, English, French, Germans, Flemish, Danish, Scottish and Sephardic Jews.

Subsequently, Brazil experienced a period of strong economic and demographic growth accompanied by mass immigration from Europe, mainly from Portugal (including the Azores and Madeira), Italy, Spain, Germany, Poland, Ukraine, Switzerland, Austria and Russia. Smaller numbers of immigrants also came from the Netherlands, France, Finland, Iceland and the Scandinavian countries, Lithuania, Belgium, Bulgaria, Hungary, Greece, Latvia, England, Ireland, Scotland, Croatia, Czech Republic, Malta, North Macedonia and Luxembourg, the Middle East (mainly from Lebanon, Syria and Armenia), Japan, the United States and South Africa, until the 1930s.

In fact, international mass immigration to Brazil during the 19th century had positive effects on the country's human capital development. Immigrants usually exhibited better formal and informal training than native Brazilians and tended to have more entrepreneurial spirit. Their arrival was beneficial for the region, not only because of the skills and knowledge they brought to the country themselves, but also because of spillover effects of their human capital to the native Brazilian population. Human capital spillover effects were strongest in regions with the highest numbers of immigrants, and the positive effects are still observable today, in some regions.

In 2007, with a population of over 209 million and abundant natural resources, Brazil is one of the ten largest markets in the world, producing tens of millions of tons of steel, 26 million tons of cement, 3.5 million television sets, and 3 million refrigerators. In addition, about 70  million cubic meters of petroleum were being processed annually into fuels, lubricants, propane gas, and a wide range of hundreds of petrochemicals.

Brazil has at least 161,500 kilometers of paved roads, more than 150 gigawatts of installed electric power capacity and its real per capita GDP surpassed US$9,800 in 2017. Its industrial sector accounts for three-fifths of the Latin American economy's industrial production. The country's scientific and technological development is argued to be attractive to foreign direct investment, in 2019, Brazil occupied the 4th largest destination for foreign investments, behind only the United States, China and Singapore.

The agricultural sector, locally called the agronegócio (agro-business), has also been dynamic: for two decades this sector has kept Brazil among the most highly productive countries in areas related to the rural sector. The agricultural sector and the mining sector also supported trade surpluses which allowed for massive currency gains (rebound) and external debt paydown. Due to a downturn in Western economies, Brazil found itself in 2010 trying to halt the appreciation of the real.

Data from the Asian Development Bank and the Tax Justice Network show the untaxed "shadow" economy of Brazil is 39% of GDP.

One of the most important corruption cases in Brazil concerns the company Odebrecht. Since the 1980s, Odebrecht has spent several billion dollars in the form of bribes to bribe parliamentarians to vote in favour of the group. At the municipal level, Odebrecht's corruption was aimed at "stimulating privatisations", particularly in water and sewer management.

Data 

The following table shows the main economic indicators in 1980–2021 (with FMI estimates for 2022-2027). Inflation below 5% is in green.

Components 
The service sector is the largest component of the gross domestic product (GDP) at 67.0 percent, followed by the industrial sector at 27.5 percent. Agriculture represents 5.5 percent of GDP (2011). The Brazilian labor force is estimated at 100.77 million of which 10 percent is occupied in agriculture, 19 percent in the industry sector and 71 percent in the service sector.

Agricultural Sector 

Brazil is the world's largest producer of sugarcane, soy, coffee, orange, guaraná, açaí and Brazil nut; is one of the top 5 producers of maize, papaya, tobacco, pineapple, banana, cotton, beans, coconut, watermelon and lemon; is one of the top 10 world producers of cocoa, cashew, avocado, tangerine, persimmon, mango, guava, rice, sorghum and tomato; and is one of the top 15 world producers of grape, apple, melon, peanut, fig, peach, onion, palm oil and natural rubber.

In the production of animal proteins, Brazil is today one of the largest countries in the world. In 2019, the country was the world's largest exporter of chicken meat. It was also the second largest producer of beef, the world's third largest producer of milk, the world's fourth largest producer of pork and the seventh largest producer of eggs in the world.

Agribusiness contributes to Brazil's trade balance, in spite of trade barriers and subsidizing policies adopted by the developed countries.

In the space of fifty five years (1950 to 2005), the population of Brazil grew from 51 million to approximately 187 million inhabitants, an increase of over 2 percent per year. Brazil created and expanded a complex agribusiness sector. However, some of this is at the expense of the environment, including the Amazon.

The importance given to the rural producer takes place in the shape of the agricultural and cattle-raising plan and through another specific subsidy program geared towards family agriculture Programa de Fortalecimento da Agricultura Familiar (Pronaf), which guarantees financing for equipment and cultivation and encourages the use of new technology. With regards to family agriculture, over 800 thousand rural inhabitants are assisted by credit, research and extension programs. A special line of credit is available for women and young farmers.

With The Land Reform Program, on the other hand, the country's objective is to provide suitable living and working conditions for families who live in areas allotted by the State, an initiative capable of generating jobs. Through partnerships, public policies and international partnerships, the government is working towards guaranteeing infrastructure for the settlements, following the examples of schools and health outlets. The idea is that access to land represents just the first step towards the implementation of a quality land reform program.

Over 600,000 km2 of land are divided into approximately five thousand areas of rural property; an agricultural area currently with three borders: the Central-western region (savannah), the northern region (area of transition) and parts of the northeastern region (semi-arid). At the forefront of grain crops, which produce over 110 million tonnes/year, is the soybean, yielding 50 million tonnes.

In the cattle-raising sector, the "green ox," which is raised in pastures, on a diet of hay and mineral salts, conquered markets in Asia, Europe and the Americas, particularly after the "mad cow disease" scare period. Brazil has the largest cattle herd in the world, with 198 million heads, responsible for exports of more than US$1 billion/year.

A pioneer and leader in the manufacture of short-fiber timber cellulose, Brazil has also achieved positive results within the packaging sector, in which it is the fifth largest world producer. In the foreign markets, it answers for 25 percent of global exports of raw cane and refined sugar; it is the world leader in soybean exports and is responsible for 80 percent of the planet's orange juice, and since 2003, has had the highest sales figures for beef and chicken.

Mining

In the mining sector, Brazil stands out in the extraction of iron ore (where it is the second world exporter), copper, gold, bauxite (one of the 5 largest producers in the world), manganese (one of the 5 largest producers in the world), tin (one of the largest producers in the world), niobium (concentrates 98% of reserves known to the world) and nickel. In terms of gemstones, Brazil is the world's largest producer of amethyst, topaz, agate and one of the main producers of tourmaline, emerald, aquamarine, garnet and opal.

In 2019, Brazil's figures were as follows: it was the world's largest producer of niobium (88.9 thousand tons); the 2nd largest world producer of tantalum (430 tons); the 2nd largest world producer of iron ore (405 million tons); the 4th largest world producer of manganese (1.74 million tons); the 4th largest world producer of bauxite (34 million tons); the 4th largest world producer of vanadium (5.94 thousand tons); the 5th largest world producer of lithium (2.4 thousand tons); the 6th largest world producer of tin (14 thousand tons); the 8th largest world producer of nickel (60.6 thousand tons); the 8th largest world producer of phosphate (4.7 million tons); the 12th largest world producer of gold (90 tons); the 14th largest world producer of copper (360 thousand tons); the 14th largest world producer of titanium (25 thousand tons); the 13th largest world producer of gypsum (3 million tons); the 3rd largest world producer of graphite (96 thousand tons); the 21st largest world producer of sulfur (500 thousand tons); the 9th largest world producer of salt (7.4 million tons); besides having had a chromium production of 200 thousand tons.

Industry 

Brazil has the second-largest manufacturing sector in the Americas. Accounting for 28.5 percent of GDP, Brazil's industries range from automobiles, steel and petrochemicals to computers, aircraft, and consumer durables. With increased economic stability provided by the Plano Real, Brazilian and multinational businesses have invested heavily in new equipment and technology, a large proportion of which has been purchased from U.S. firms.

The World Bank lists the main producing countries each year, based on the total production value. According to the 2019 list, Brazil has the 13th most valuable industry in the world (US$173.6 billion). In the Americas, it is second only to the United States (2nd place) and Mexico (12th place). In the food industry, in 2019, Brazil was the second largest exporter of processed foods in the world. In 2016, the country was the 2nd largest producer of pulp in the world and the 8th producer of paper. In the footwear industry, in 2019, Brazil ranked 4th among world producers. In 2019, the country was the 8th producer of vehicles and the 9th producer of steel in the world. In 2018, the chemical industry of Brazil was the 8th in the world. In textile industry, Brazil, although it was among the 5 largest world producers in 2013, is very little integrated in world trade. In the aviation sector, Brazil has Embraer, the third largest aircraft manufacturer in the world, behind Boeing and Airbus.

Brazil has a diverse and sophisticated services industry as well. During the early 1990s, the banking sector accounted for as much as 16 percent of the GDP. Although undergoing a major overhaul, Brazil's financial services industry provides local businesses with a wide range of products and is attracting numerous new entrants, including U.S. financial firms. On 8 May 2008, the São Paulo Stock Exchange (Bovespa) and the São Paulo-based Brazilian Mercantile and Futures Exchange (BM&F) merged, creating BM&F Bovespa, one of the largest stock exchanges in the world. Also, the previously monopolistic reinsurance sector is being opened up to third-party companies.

 31 December 2007, there were an estimated 21,304,000 broadband lines in Brazil. Over 75 percent of the broadband lines were via DSL and 10 percent via cable modems.

Proven mineral resources are extensive. Large iron and manganese reserves are important sources of industrial raw materials and export earnings. Deposits of nickel, tin, chromite, uranium, bauxite, beryllium, copper, lead, tungsten, zinc, gold, and other minerals are exploited. High-quality coking-grade coal required in the steel industry is in short supply.

Creative Industries 

The first study into the impact of the Creative Industries on the Brazilian economy was published by FIRJAN. The creative economy in Latin America was termed the "Orange Economy" in a publication released by the Inter-American Development Bank (IDB). This 2013 study valued Brazil's Orange Economy at US$66.87 billion providing 5,280,000 jobs and responsible for US$9.414 million in exports, with the value of creative exports being higher than the US$8.016 million value of coffee exports over the same period.

A 2021 study into the Intellectual Property Intensive Sectors in the Brazilian Economy was undertaken as part of the National Strategy on Intellectual Property 2021–2030. The study found that 450 of the 673 economic classes could be classified as IP-intensive sectors that collectively employed 19.3 million people. The share of GDP between 2014 and 2016 across these economic classes amounted to R$2.1 trillion reais or 44.2% of GDP over this time.

Tourism 

In the list of world tourist destinations, in 2018, Brazil was the 48th most visited country, with 6.6 million tourists (and revenues of 5.9 billion dollars). Tourism in South America as a whole is still underdeveloped: in Europe, for example, countries obtain annual tourism figures like $73.7 billion (Spain), receiving 82.7 million tourists or 67.3 billion (France), receiving 89.4 million tourists. While Europe received 710 million tourists in 2018, Asia 347 million and North America 142.2 million, South America received only 37 million, Central America 10.8 million and the Caribbean 25.7 million.

Largest companies 

  
In 2017, 20 Brazilian companies were listed in the Forbes Global 2000 list – an annual ranking of the top 2000 public companies in the world by Forbes magazine based on a combination of sales, assets, profit, and market value. The 20 companies listed were:

Energy 

The Brazilian government has undertaken an ambitious program to reduce dependence on imported petroleum. Imports previously accounted for more than 70% of the country's oil needs but Brazil became self-sufficient in oil in 2006–2007. Brazil was the 10th largest oil producer in the world in 2019, with 2.8 million barrels / day. Production manages to supply the country's demand. In the beginning of 2020, in the production of oil and natural gas, the country exceeded 4 million barrels of oil equivalent per day, for the first time. In January this year, 3.168 million barrels of oil per day and 138.753 million cubic meters of natural gas were extracted.

Brazil is one of the main world producers of hydroelectric power. In 2019, Brazil had 217 hydroelectric plants in operation, with an installed capacity of 98,581 MW, 60.16% of the country's energy generation. In the total generation of electricity, in 2019 Brazil reached 170,000 megawatts of installed capacity, more than 75% from renewable sources (the majority, hydroelectric).

In 2013, the Southeast Region used about 50% of the load of the National Integrated System (SIN), being the main energy consuming region in the country. The region's installed electricity generation capacity totaled almost 42,500 MW, which represented about a third of Brazil's generation capacity. The hydroelectric generation represented 58% of the region's installed capacity, with the remaining 42% corresponding basically to the thermoelectric generation. São Paulo accounted for 40% of this capacity; Minas Gerais by about 25%; Rio de Janeiro by 13.3%; and Espírito Santo accounted for the rest. The South Region owns the Itaipu Dam, which was the largest hydroelectric plant in the world for several years, until the inauguration of Three Gorges Dam in China. It remains the second largest operating hydroelectric in the world. Brazil is the co-owner of the Itaipu Plant with Paraguay: the dam is located on the Paraná River, located on the border between countries. It has an installed generation capacity of 14 GW for 20 generating units of 700 MW each. North Region has large hydroelectric plants, such as Belo Monte Dam and Tucuruí Dam, which produce much of the national energy. Brazil's hydroelectric potential has not yet been fully exploited, so the country still has the capacity to build several renewable energy plants in its territory.

 according to ONS, total installed capacity of wind power was 22 GW, with average capacity factor of 58%. While the world average wind production capacity factors is 24.7%, there are areas in Northern Brazil, specially in Bahia State, where some wind farms record with average capacity factors over 60%; the average capacity factor in the Northeast Region is 45% in the coast and 49% in the interior. In 2019, wind energy represented 9% of the energy generated in the country. In 2019, it was estimated that the country had an estimated wind power generation potential of around 522 GW (this, only onshore), enough energy to meet three times the country's current demand. In 2021 Brazil was the 7th country in the world in terms of installed wind power (21 GW), and the 4th largest producer of wind energy in the world (72 TWh), behind only China, USA and Germany.

Nuclear energy accounts for about 4% of Brazil's electricity. The nuclear power generation monopoly is owned by Eletronuclear (Eletrobrás Eletronuclear S/A), a wholly owned subsidiary of Eletrobrás. Nuclear energy is produced by two reactors at Angra. It is located at the Central Nuclear Almirante Álvaro Alberto (CNAAA) on the Praia de Itaorna in Angra dos Reis, Rio de Janeiro. It consists of two pressurized water reactors, Angra I, with capacity of 657 MW, connected to the power grid in 1982, and Angra II, with capacity of 1,350 MW, connected in 2000. A third reactor, Angra III, with a projected output of 1,350 MW, is planned to be finished.

 according to ONS, total installed capacity of photovoltaic solar was 21 GW, with average capacity factor of 23%. Some of the most irradiated Brazilian States are MG ("Minas Gerais"), BA ("Bahia") and GO (Goiás), which have indeed world irradiation level records. In 2019, solar power represented 1,27% of the energy generated in the country. In 2021, Brazil was the 14th country in the world in terms of installed solar power (13 GW), and the 11th largest producer of solar energy in the world (16.8 TWh).

In 2020, Brazil was also the 2nd largest country in the world in the production of energy through biomass (energy production from solid biofuels and renewable waste), with 15,2 GW installed.

Transport 

Transport in Brazil is basically carried out using the road mode, the most developed in the region. There is also a considerable infrastructure of ports and airports. The railway and fluvial sector, although it has potential, is usually treated in a secondary way.

Brazil has more than 1.7 million km of roads, of which 215,000 km are paved, and about 14,000 km are divided highways. The two most important highways in the country are BR-101 and BR-116. Due to the Andes Mountains, Amazon River and Amazon Forest, there have always been difficulties in implementing transcontinental or bioceanic highways. Practically the only route that existed was the one that connected Brazil to Buenos Aires, in Argentina and later to Santiago, in Chile. However, in recent years, with the combined effort of South American countries, new routes have started to emerge, such as Brazil-Peru (Interoceanic Highway), and a new highway between Brazil, Paraguay, northern Argentina and northern Chile (Bioceanic Corridor).

There are more than 2,000 airports in Brazil. The country has the second largest number of airports in the world, behind only the United States. São Paulo International Airport, located in the Metropolitan Region of São Paulo, is the largest and busiest in the country – the airport connects São Paulo to practically all major cities around the world. Brazil has 44 international airports, such as those in Rio de Janeiro, Brasília, Belo Horizonte, Porto Alegre, Florianópolis, Cuiabá, Salvador, Recife, Fortaleza, Belém and Manaus, among others. The 10 busiest airports in South America in 2017 were: São Paulo-Guarulhos (Brazil), Bogotá (Colombia), São Paulo-Congonhas (Brazil), Santiago (Chile), Lima (Peru), Brasília (Brazil), Rio de Janeiro (Brazil), Buenos Aires-Aeroparque (Argentina), Buenos Aires-Ezeiza (Argentina), and Minas Gerais (Brazil).

About ports, Brazil has some of the busiest ports in South America, such as Port of Santos, Port of Rio de Janeiro, Port of Paranaguá, Port of Itajaí, Port of Rio Grande, Port of São Francisco do Sul and Suape Port. The 15 busiest ports in South America are: Port of Santos (Brazil), Port of Bahia de Cartagena (Colombia), Callao (Peru), Guayaquil (Ecuador), Buenos Aires (Argentina), San Antonio (Chile), Buenaventura (Colombia), Itajaí (Brazil), Valparaíso (Chile), Montevideo (Uruguay), Paranaguá (Brazil), Rio Grande (Brazil), São Francisco do Sul (Brazil), Manaus (Brazil) and Coronel (Chile).

The Brazilian railway network has an extension of about 30,000 kilometers. It's basically used for transporting ores.

Among the main Brazilian waterways, two stand out: Hidrovia Tietê-Paraná (which has a length of 2,400 km, 1,600 on the Paraná River and 800 km on the Tietê River, draining agricultural production from the states of Mato Grosso, Mato Grosso do Sul, Goiás and part of Rondônia, Tocantins and Minas General) and Hidrovia do Solimões-Amazonas (it has two sections: Solimões, which extends from Tabatinga to Manaus, with approximately 1600 km, and Amazonas, which extends from Manaus to Belém, with 1650 km.

Almost entirely passenger transport from the Amazon basin is done by this waterway, in addition to practically all cargo transportation that is directed to the major regional centers of Belém and Manaus). In Brazil, this transport is still underutilized: the most important waterway stretches, from an economic point of view, are found in the Southeast and South of the country. Its full use still depends on the construction of locks, major dredging works and, mainly, of ports that allow intermodal integration.

Exports and imports

Products 
Brazil was the 25th largest exporter in the world in 2020, with 1.1% of the global total.

In 2021, Brazil exported US$280.4 billion and imported US$219.4 billion, with a surplus of US$61 billion.

The country's top ten export products were:
 Iron ore: US$42.2 billion
 Soy: US$37.3 billion
 Crude petroleum oils: US$27.4 billion
 Sugar: US$8.5 billion
 Beef: US$7.4 billion
 Soybean meal: US$7.2 billion
 Petroleum fuel oils: US$6.6 billion
 Manufacturing Industry: US$6.4 billion
 Chicken meat: US$6.3 billion
 Cellulose: US$6.1 billion

The country also exports maize, coffee, cotton, tobacco, orange juice, footwear, airplanes, helicopters, cars, vehicle parts, gold, ethanol, semi-finished iron, among others.

Exports 
The main countries to which Brazil exports in 2021 were:
  China: US$87.6 billion (31.28%)
  United States: US$31.1 billion (11.09%)
  Argentina: US$11.8 billion (4.24%)
  Netherlands: US$9.3 billion (3.32%)
  Chile: US$6.9 billion (2.50%)
  Singapore: US$5.8 billion (2.10%)
  Mexico: US$5.5 billion (1.98%)
  Germany: US$5.5 billion (1.97%)
  Japan: US$5.5 billion (1.97%)
  Spain: US$5.4 billion (1.94%)

The country's export model, until today, is excessively based on exports of basic or semi-manufactured products, generating criticism, since such model generates little monetary value, which prevents further growth in the country in the long run. There are several factors that cause this problem, the main ones being: the excessive collection of taxes on production (due to the country's economic and legislative model being based on State Capitalism and not on Free-Market Capitalism), the lack or deficiency of infrastructure (means of transport such as roads, railways and ports that are insufficient or weak for the country's needs, bad logistics and excessive bureaucracy) for export, high production costs (expensive energy, expensive fuel, expensive maintenance of trucks, expensive loan rates and bank financing for production, expensive export rates), the lack of an industrial policy, the lack of focus on adding value, the lack of aggressiveness in international negotiations, in addition to abusive tariff barriers imposed by other countries on the country's exports. Because of this, Brazil has never been very prominent in international trade.

Due to its size and potential, it would be able to be among the 10 largest exporters in the world, however, its participation in global commercial transactions usually oscillates between 0.5 and 2% only. In 2019, among the ten products that Brazil exports the most and that generate the most value, eight come from the agribusiness. Although still modest, the country's exports have evolved, and today they are more diversified than they were in the past. At the beginning of the 20th century, 70% of Brazilian exports were restricted to coffee. Overall, however, global trade still concentrates its few exports on low-tech products (mainly agricultural and mineral commodities) and, therefore, with low added value.

Imports 
The main countries from which Brazil imports in 2021 were:
  China: US$47.6 billion (21.72%)
  United States: US$39.3 billion (17.95%)
  Argentina: US$11.9 billion (5.45%)
  Germany: US$11.3 billion (5.17%)
  India: US$6.7 billion (3.07%)
  Russia: US$5.7 billion (2.60%)
  Italy: US$5.4 billion (2.50%)
  Japan: US$5.1 billion (2.35%)
  South Korea: US$5.1 billion (2.33%)
  France: US$4.8 billion (2.19%)

Economic status

Sustainable growth 
Portuguese explorers arrived in 1500, but it was only in 1808 that Brazil obtained a permit from the Portuguese colonial government to set up its first factories and manufacturers. In the 21st century, Brazil became the eighth largest economy in the world. Originally, its exports were basic raw and primary goods, such as sugar, rubber and gold. Today, 84% of exports are of manufactured and semi-manufactured products.

The period of great economic transformation and growth occurred between 1875 and 1975.

In the last decade, domestic production increased by 32.3%. Agribusiness (agriculture and cattle-raising), which grew by 47% or 3.6% per year, was the most dynamic sector – even after having weathered international crises that demanded constant adjustments to the Brazilian economy. The Brazilian government also launched a program for economic development acceleration called Programa de Aceleração do Crescimento, aiming to spur growth.

Brazil's transparency rank in the international world is 75th according to Transparency International.

Control and reform 
Among measures recently adopted to balance the economy, Brazil carried out reforms to its social security (state and retirement pensions) and tax systems. These changes brought with them a noteworthy addition: a Law of Fiscal Responsibility which controls public expenditure by the executive branches at federal, state and municipal levels. At the same time, investments were made towards administration efficiency and policies were created to encourage exports, industry and trade, thus creating "windows of opportunity" for local and international investors and producers.

With these alterations in place, Brazil has reduced its vulnerability: it does not import the oil it consumes; it has halved its domestic debt through exchange rate-linked certificates and has seen exports grow, on average, by 20% a year. The exchange rate does not put pressure on the industrial sector or inflation (at 4% a year), and does away with the possibility of a liquidity crisis. As a result, the country, after 12 years, has achieved a positive balance in the accounts which measure exports/imports, plus interest payments, services and overseas payment. Thus, respected economists say that the country will not be deeply affected by the current world economic crisis.

In 2017, President Michel Temer refused to make public the list of companies accused of "modern slavery". The list, made public yearly since the presidency of Lula Da Silva in 2003, was intended to persuade companies to settle their fines and conform to labor regulations, in a country where corruption of the political class risked compromising respect for the law. The relations of the president-in-office with the "landowner lobby" were denounced by dismissed President Dilma Rousseff on this occasion.

Consistent policies 
Support for the productive sector has been simplified at all levels; active and independent, Congress and the Judiciary Branch carry out the evaluation of rules and regulations. Among the main measures taken to stimulate the economy are the reduction of up to 30 percent on manufactured products tax (IPI), and the investment of $8 billion on road cargo transportation fleets, thus improving distribution logistics. Further resources guarantee the propagation of business and information telecenters.

The policy for industry, technology and foreign trade, at the forefront of this sector, for its part, invests $19.5 billion in specific sectors, following the example of the software and semiconductor, pharmaceutical and medicine product, and capital goods sectors.

Mergers and acquisitions 
Between 1985 and 2017, 11,563 mergers & acquisitions with a total known value of US$1,185 billion with the involvement of Brazilian firms were announced. The year 2010 was a new record in terms of value with $115 billion of transactions. It is worth noticing, that in the top 100 deals by value there are only four cases of Brazilian companies acquiring a foreign company. This reflects the strong interest in the country from a direct investment perspective.

Here is a list of the largest deals where Brazilian companies took on either the role of the acquiror or the target:

Entrepreneurship 

According to a search of Global Entrepreneurship Monitor in 2011 Brazil had 27 million adults aged between 18 and 64 either starting or owning a business, meaning that more than one in four Brazilian adults were entrepreneurs. In comparison to the other 54 countries studied, Brazil was the third-highest in total number of entrepreneurs. The Institute of Applied Economic Research (Ipea), a government agency, found that 37 million jobs in Brazil were associated with businesses with less than 10 employees.

Even though Brazil ranks internationally as one of the hardest countries in the region to do business due to its complicated bureaucracy, there is a healthy number of entrepreneurs, thanks to the huge internal consumer market and various government programs.

The most recent research of Global Entrepreneurship Monitor revealed in 2013 that 50.4% of Brazilian new entrepreneurs are men, 33.8% are in the 35–44 age group, 36.9% completed high school and 47.9% earn 3–6 times the Brazilian minimum wage. In contrast, 49.6% of entrepreneurs are female, only 7% are in the 55–64 age group, 1% have postgraduate education and 1.7% earn more than 9 times the minimum wage.

Credit rating 
Brazil's credit rating was downgraded by Standard & Poor's (S&P) to BBB in March 2014, just one notch above junk. It was further downgraded in January 2018 by S&P to BB-, which is 2 notches below investment grade.

See also 
 Economic history of Brazil
 List of economic crises in Brazil
 Brazilian packaging market
 Brazil and the World Bank
 Economy of São Paulo
 List of Brazilian federative units by gross domestic product
 2015–2017 Brazilian economic crisis
 List of Latin American and Caribbean countries by GDP growth
 List of Latin American and Caribbean countries by GDP (nominal)
 List of Latin American and Caribbean countries by GDP (PPP)

References

Further reading
 Furtado, Celso. Formação econômica do Brasil 
 Prado Junior, Caio. História econômica do Brasil

External links 

Ministry of Finance (Brazil)
IBGE : Brazilian Institute of Geography and Statistics
World Bank Summary Trade Statistics Brazil
Brazil profile at the CIA World Factbook
Brazil profile at The World Bank

 
Brazil

de:Brasilien#Wirtschaft